Olivier Gigon (born January 4, 1979) is a Swiss former professional ice hockey goaltender. He played in Switzerland’s Nationalliga A for EHC Basel, Fribourg-Gottéron and SC Bern.

References

External links

1979 births
Living people
EHC Basel players
HC Ajoie players
HC Fribourg-Gottéron players
HC La Chaux-de-Fonds players
HC Sierre players
Neuchâtel Young Sprinters HC players
SC Bern players
Swiss ice hockey goaltenders
People from Delémont
Sportspeople from the canton of Jura